Athiasella relicta is a species of mite in the family Ologamasidae.

Subspecies
These two subspecies belong to the species Athiasella relicta:
 Athiasella relicta major (Womersley, 1942)
 Athiasella relicta relicta

References

Ologamasidae
Articles created by Qbugbot
Animals described in 1942